Johnny Rocco is a 1958 crime film noir directed by Paul Landres starring Richard Eyer, Stephen McNally, and Coleen Gray.

Plot
Young Johnny Rocco (Richard Eyer) is disturbed after seeing his gangster father Tony (Stephen McNally) involved in a murder. The gang, fearing young Johnny might tip the police, decide to silence both him and his father. Frightened, Johnny seeks help from schoolteacher Miss 
Mayfield (Coleen Gray) and gets some help from Father Regan (Leslie Bradley) and police detective Garron (Russ Conway) before his father has a final showdown with the gang.

Cast
Main cast includes:
 Richard Eyer as Johnny Rocco
 Stephen McNally as Tony Rocco
 Coleen Gray as Lois Mayfield, Teacher
 Russ Conway as Police Lt. Fred Garron
 Leslie Bradley as Father Regan
 James Flavin as Mooney
 Matty Fain as Dino

and includes appearances by:
 William Bakewell as Joe the Police Scientist 
 Ralph Brooks as Father
 Carey Loftin as Motorcycle Cop 
 Frank Wilcox as Gordon Lane
 Robert Mitchell as Choir Leader
 John Mitchum as Police Detective at Stakeout
 Thomas Browne Henry as Principal Farrington

Production

Filming locations included Zoo Drive.

Releases
The film was first released by Allied Artists theatrically in the United States in December 1958. It had European releases as Rauschgiftschmuggler und Gangster in Austria, as Im Dschungel der Großstadt in West Germany in 1960, and as Det lille vidne in Denmark in 1962. Its other language titles include A Morte Selou Seus Lábios for Brazil, Ego eida ton dolofono for Greece,  and Il riscatto di un gangster for Italy.

Reception

See also

References

External links
 

American black-and-white films
1958 films
1958 crime films
American crime films
Films directed by Paul Landres
Allied Artists films
1950s English-language films
1950s American films